Dmitry Sergeyevich Dokhturov (1756 - November 14(26), 1816, Moscow) was a Russian infantry general and a prominent military leader during the Patriotic War of 1812.

General
During the War of the Third Coalition, he participated in the Battle of Dürenstein; during this battle, in the cross-fire between Pierre Dupont and himself, Johann Heinrich von Schmitt was shot by one of Dokhturov's infantrymen. Dokhturov also commanded the first column in the Battle of Austerlitz, where his force was isolated with its back to a lake. When some of his men tried to escape over the frozen lake, French artillery fire shattered the ice and many Russians perished. In general, however, he managed to extricate his troops from the French envelopment at Pratzen. During the War of the Fourth Coalition, Dokhturov fought at Eylau and Friedland. Promoted to General of Infantry in 1810, Dokhturov fought in the Battle of Smolensk. In the Battle of Borodino he commanded in the center of the Russian line and after Pyotr Bagration was mortally wounded, he commanded the left flank. Dokhturov was involved in heavy fighting once again when he led his Sixth Corps in the Battle of Maloyaroslavets. When the Russians discovered that some French troops were near Fominskoe, Field Marshal Kutusov ordered Dokhturov to attack them. But just before Dokhturov attacked, Russian partisans warned him that the French force near Fominskoe was no mere detachment; it was the main French army, commanded by Napoleon himself. Thus was a Russian catastrophe averted. Kutusov then sent Dokhturov to Maloyaroslavets, a town with a population of 1,600 people. Here Dokhturov encountered the corps of Napoleon's stepson, Eugène de Beauharnais, which consisted of largely Italian troops. Battle raged all day in the streets of Maloyaroslavets, as 32,000 Russians fought 24,000 Italians. The Italians in particular fought with distinction in this battle. By the end of the day the town had burned to the ground, killing hundreds of wounded Russian and Italian soldiers who in their desperate condition could not drag themselves out of the inferno. The battle was a draw, with perhaps a small advantage for the Italians. There were about 7,000 casualties on each side. Eugene and his Italians occupied Maloyaroslavets, but Dokhturov and his Russians occupied a strong position just south of town blocking the road to Kaluga.
  
In the aftermath of the Hundred Days, during the advance of Field Marshal Tolly's Russian army into France in 1815, Dokhturov commanded the right column.

See also
 Dmitry Dokhturov is mentioned in Tolstoy's War and Peace, where he is lauded as a great and effective soldier who is little recognized precisely because he fulfills his role so silently and effectively. 
 He is an ancestor of E. L. Doctorow.

Notes and references

1756 births
1816 deaths
Dokhturov, Sergey
Recipients of the Order of St. George of the Second Degree
Recipients of the Order of St. George of the Third Degree